Garrett Mitchell (born September 2, 1991) is a Canadian professional ice hockey forward who currently plays for the Rockford IceHogs in the American Hockey League (AHL). He was selected in the sixth round 175th overall by the Washington Capitals in the 2009 NHL Entry Draft.

Playing career

He played junior hockey for the Regina Pats of the WHL, serving as team captain his final year (2010–2011).

He was selected by Washington Capitals in the sixth round (175th overall) of the 2009 NHL Entry Draft. He signed his three-year entry-level contract with the Capitals on March 19, 2011, just after the Regina Pats concluded their 2010–11 season.

In the 2016–17 season, Mitchell made his NHL debut on April 9, 2017 in the Capitals regular season finale against the Florida Panthers.

As a free agent from the Capitals having spent 6 years within the organization, Mitchell opted to continue his tenure as captain of the Hershey Bears in the AHL, securing a one-year contract on July 10, 2017.

Following his eighth year with the Bears in 2017–18, Mitchell left the club as free agent. Over the summer, Mitchell remained un-signed before opting to continue his career in Europe, agreeing to a one-year deal with Slovakian club, HKm Zvolen of the Tipsport Liga, on November 25, 2018.

After a lone season abroad in Slovakia, Mitchell returned to North America the following summer, agreeing to a contract with the Reading Royals of the ECHL on September 30, 2019. After putting up 20 points in 32 GP with the Reading Royals in the ECHL, Mitchell was loaned to the Laval Rocket. He made 2 appearances with the Rocket before returning to the Royals.

Career statistics

Regular season and playoffs

International

References

External links
 
 
 

1991 births
Living people
Canadian expatriate ice hockey players in the United States
Canadian ice hockey forwards
Hershey Bears players
HKM Zvolen players
Ice hockey people from Saskatchewan
Laval Rocket players
Reading Royals players
Regina Pats players
Rockford IceHogs (AHL) players
South Carolina Stingrays players
Sportspeople from Regina, Saskatchewan
Washington Capitals draft picks
Washington Capitals players
Canadian expatriate ice hockey players in Slovakia